The Place Where the Black Stars Hang is the fourth album by Welsh ambient musician Lustmord, released in 1994. The album consists of a single 75-minute title-track that is broken up into 5 movements on the reissue.

Track listing

Original track listing

Reissue track listing

Notes 
On some versions, Aldebaran is misspelled as "Aldebran."
The reissue is split up into five tracks, one for each of the sections.

1994 albums
Lustmord albums